Arthur Mitchell is a Canadian politician, who was a member of the Legislative Assembly of Yukon and the Leader of the Official Opposition from 2006 to 2011. He is a former real estate agent and an assistant to John Ostashek, the Yukon Party Government Leader (Premier) from 1992 to 1996. Mitchell was elected leader in June 2005 in a leadership race against Pat Duncan, the Yukon's first Liberal premier, and remained leader until his defeat in the 2011 Yukon election.

Personal life

Mitchell is originally from the community of New Rochelle, New York. He is the brother of television journalist Andrea Mitchell who is married to Alan Greenspan. He is son of Cecile and Sydney Mitchell. Mitchell's father was the chief executive officer and partial owner of a furniture manufacturing company in Manhattan and was also the president of Beth El Synagogue in New Rochelle for 40 years. His mother was an administrator at the New York Institute of Technology in Manhattan. Mitchell moved to Canada in the 1970s, settling in Atlin, British Columbia to run a general store until moving to Yukon in the early 1990s and becoming a real estate agent in Whitehorse.

Mitchell has also served as alternate chair of the Yukon Worker's Compensation Health and Safety Board and on the City of Whitehorse Parks and Recreation Board.

Political career

Mitchell ran unsuccessfully in the newly created Whitehorse riding of Copperbelt in the 2002 Yukon election, but was defeated by Yukon Party candidate Haakon Arntzen.

In the 2002 election, the Liberals were reduced from government to just a single seat, that of leader and former Yukon Premier Pat Duncan. Duncan consequently called for a confidence vote in her leadership, which Mitchell contested. He defeated Duncan by 54 votes in June 2005.

Mitchell soon after contested a by-election in the riding of Copperbelt in 2005, following the resignation of Haakon Arntzen after convictions of indecent assault. Mitchell was elected to the Yukon Legislative Assembly in the November 21, 2005 by-election.

Mitchell led his party to gaining Official Opposition status in May 2006, following the defection of two New Democrat MLAs, Gary McRobb and Eric Fairclough, to the Liberal caucus. Under Mitchell's leadership, the Liberals retained Official Opposition status later that year in the 2006 Yukon election, increasing the party's seat count by one. Mitchell served as the Yukon's Leader of the Official Opposition during the 32nd Legislative Assembly.

Mitchell announced his intention to seek re-election in the redistributed riding of Copperbelt North in the 2011 election, after his riding of Copperbelt was dissolved. However, he was defeated by Currie Dixon of the Yukon Party and announced his resignation as the head of the Yukon Liberal Party. As a result of its loss, the Yukon Liberal Party was once again reduced to third party status.

Election results

2011 general election

|-

|-

| Liberal
| Arthur Mitchell
| align="right"| 407
| align="right"| 37.4%
| align="right"| –
|-

| NDP
| Skeeter Miller-Wright
| align="right"| 159
| align="right"| 14.6%
| align="right"| –
|-
! align=left colspan=3|Total
! align=right| 1088
! align=right| 100.0%
! align=right| –
|}

2006 general election

|-
 
|Liberal
|Arthur Mitchell
|align="right"| 632
|align="right"| 52.5%
|align="right"| +3.0%

|NDP
|David Hedmann
|align="right"| 191
|align="right"| 15.9%
|align="right"| -14.8%
|- bgcolor="white"
!align="left" colspan=3|Total
!align="right"| 1204
!align="right"| 100.0%
!align="right"| –

2005 by-election

|-
 
|Liberal
|Arthur Mitchell
|align="right"|459
|align="right"|49.5%
|align="right"|+16.9%

|NDP
|Maureen Stephens
|align="right"|285
|align="right"|30.7%
|align="right"|+3.2%

|- bgcolor="white"
!align="left" colspan=3|Total
!align="right"| 927
!align="right"| 100.0%
!align="right"| –

On the resignation of Haakon Arntzen (September 2005).

2002 general election

|-

 
|Liberal
|Arthur Mitchell
|align="right"| 312
|align="right"| 32.6%
|align="right"| –
|-

|NDP
|Lillian Grubach-Hambrook
|align="right"| 263
|align="right"| 27.5%
|align="right"| –
|- bgcolor="white"
!align="left" colspan=3|Total
!align="right"| 957
!align="right"| 100.0%
!align="right"| –

References

1950 births
Yukon Liberal Party MLAs
Living people
People from the Regional District of Kitimat–Stikine
Politicians from Whitehorse
Politicians from New Rochelle, New York
Yukon Liberal Party leaders
Jewish Canadian politicians
American emigrants to Canada
21st-century Canadian politicians